Victoria Grace Blackburn (17 April 1865 – 4 March 1928) was a Canadian journalist and author.

Biography
Blackburn was born on April 17, 1865 in Quebec City. In 1894, after studying at Hellmuth Ladies' College, Blackburn began writing for the London Free Press. In 1890s she also worked as a teacher. The paper was published by her father, Josiah Blackburn, and, later, by her brother, Walter Josiah Blackburn. In 1900 she became the paper's literary and drama critic.

Blackburn studied criticism in New York and spent some years in Europe with her sisters. In 1918 she returned to Canada and became managing editor of the London Free Press. She stayed in that position for a decade and was an important figure among London's cultural elite.

Beyond her journalism, Blackburn published dozens of poems, two plays and a novel.

Bibliography

References

External links
 Blackburn in SFU Digitized Collections, Simon Fraser University, Coll. Canada's Early Women Writers (with photograph)

1865 births
1928 deaths
19th-century Canadian journalists
20th-century Canadian journalists
Canadian women journalists
Canadian newspaper editors
Women newspaper editors
19th-century Canadian poets
20th-century Canadian poets
Canadian women poets
Canadian women non-fiction writers
20th-century Canadian women writers
19th-century women writers
19th-century women journalists